The Berrenda is a type of cattle from the Spanish region of Andalusia. It is subdivided into two breeds; the Red Berrenda and the Black Berrenda. 
Both breeds are rustic and very well adapted to the environment.

See also 
 List of Spanish cattle breeds

Cattle breeds originating in Spain